Negru Vodă ("[The] Black Voivode" or "[The] Black Prince"), also known as Radu Negru ("Radu [the] Black"), is the legendary founder of Wallachia.

Name
Radu is a name derived from the Slavic word for "joy". In 2009, Radu was the 43rd most popular name among Romanian boys in the modern state of Romania and Moldova.

Traditions
According to Romanian traditions, Negru Vodă would have been the founder and ruler of Wallachia at a date around 1290. The legend was first mentioned in the 17th-century Cantacuzino Annals, which also state that the prince built large churches in Câmpulung and Curtea de Argeș, successive capitals of Wallachia. This is probably a confusion with Radu I of Wallachia, who reigned 1377–1383. Legends surrounding Meșterul Manole also mention Negru Vodă as the commissioner of the church and blend his image with that of Neagoe Basarab, who ruled at a much later date than Radu I.

In various folk traditions and legends, Negru Vodă's image blends with that of the following rulers:
 Thocomerius, father of Basarab I
 Basarab I (c. 1270–1351/52), Great Voivode of Wallachia
 Nicolae Alexandru, Voivode of Wallachia (c. 1352 – 1364) 
 Radu I, Voivode of Wallachia (c. 1377 – c. 1383)
 Neagoe Basarab, Voivode of Wallachia (1512-1521)

See also
 Curtea de Argeș Cathedral
 Foundation of Wallachia

References

 Neagu Djuvara: Thocomerius-Negru Vodă, un voivod de origine cumană la începuturile Țării Românești: cum a purces întemeierea primului stat medieval românesc dinainte de "descălecătoare" și până la așezarea Mitropoliei Ungrovlahiei la Argeș: noi interpretări/Thocomerius - Negru Vodă: a voivode of Cumanian origin at the beginning of Wallachia: how the foundation of the first medieval Romanian state began before "dismounting" and until the settlement of the Metropolitanate of Ungrovlahia in Argeș: new interpretations, Editura Humanitas, București, 2007,

External links
 Basarabii: Radu Negru (Black) (in Romanian)

Rulers of Wallachia
Legendary monarchs
Legendary Romanian people
 
Year of death unknown
1269 births